Arijit Singh made his Bollywood debut with Mithoon-composition, "Phir Mohabbat" from Murder 2, which was recorded in 2009 though released in 2011. The following year, he worked with Pritam for four of his films. He rendered four versions of the song "Raabta" in Agent Vinod. He also lent his voice for Chirantan Bhatt in 1920: Evil Returns [3] and for Vishal–Shekhar in Shanghai, where the song "Duaa" from the latter fetched him Mirchi Music Award for Upcoming Male Playback Singer award and was nominated in the same category for "Phir Le Aya Dil" from Barfi!.

Singh rose to widespread prominence with the release of the song "Tum Hi Ho" from Aashiqui 2 (2013). The song fetched him several awards and nominations including his first Filmfare Awards. He worked with Jeet Gannguli for the rest of his tracks in the album. He further allied with Pritam, singing three tracks for Yeh Jawaani Hai Deewani. The duo collaborated with Shahid Kapoor, performing "Main Rang Sharbaton Ka" and "Dhokha Dhadi". Moreover, he dubbed for Shah Rukh Khan in the song "Kashmir Main Tu Kanyakumari" which was composed by Vishal–Shekhar. Apart from rendering the duet version of "Har Kisi Ko", the year marks his first collaboration with Sharib–Toshi and Sanjay Leela Bhansali by singing the song "Kabhi Jo Baadal Barse" for the former and the semi-classical number, "Laal Ishq" for the latter.

In 2014, Singh worked with Sajid–Wajid for the first time, performing two tracks of Main Tera Hero and the song "Raat Bhar". He rendered three re-mixed songs; Amit Trivedi's "Hungama Ho Gaya", Sharib–Toshi's "Samjhawan" and Arko Pravo Mukherjee's "Aaj Phir". The year marks his first collaboration with Vishal Bhardwaj, Tony Kakkar, Palak Muchhal, A. R. Rahman and Sachin–Jigar. During the year, he sang "Humdard", "Manwa Laage", "Sun Le Zara", "Sajde", two songs of Zid and three tracks of Holiday, to name a few. Gannguli-composed Muskurane garnered him most nominations from the year, while he received two Filmfare nominations for Suno Na Sangemarmar and the Sufi song Mast Magan He has also recorded a Gujarati track, Satrangi Re from the movie Wrong Side Raju .

Hindi film songs 
As a music director:

 Pagglait (2021)

As a singer:

2011

2012

2013

2014

2015

2016

2017

2018

2019

2020

2021

2022

2023

Replaced Hindi film songs

Bengali film songs

As a Background score composer:

 Egaro (2011)

 Kedara (2019)

As a singer:

2011

2012

2013

2014

2015

2016

2017

2018

2019

2020

2021

2022

2023

Hindi non-film songs

Bengali non-film songs

Songs in other Indian languages

Marathi songs

Kannada songs

Telugu songs

Tamil songs

Gujarati songs

Malayalam songs 

Assamese songs

References 

Lists of songs recorded by Indian singers